Dina Galli (1877–1951) was an Italian actress known for her comic stage roles. Galli also appeared in fourteen films during her career.

Life and career
Born Clotilde Annamaria Galli in Milan, Galli was the daughter of a well known theatrical character actress, Ernestina Nesti. In 1900 she became main actress in the Talli-Gramatica-Calabresi, and in the following years she worked in the companies led by Enrico Viarisio, Enzo Biliotti, Antonio Gandusio and Nino Besozzi.

Galli made her film debut in 1914, in two silent films directed by Nino Oxilia. During the World War I, she  voluntarily served in hospitals, entertaining wounded soldiers as a puppeteer. In 1935 she had a large success with the Giuseppe Adami's comedy play Felicita Colombo, and in 1937 she starred in a film adaptation with the same name directed by Mario Mattoli. 

She spoke with a distinctive Lombardy accent.

Selected filmography
Nini Falpala (1933)
 Felicita Colombo (1937)
 Nonna Felicita (1938)
 Frenzy (1939)
 La zia smemorata (1940)
 Stasera niente di nuovo (1942)
 Il birichino di papà (1942)
My Widow and I (1945)
 Vanity (1947)

References

External links
 

1877 births
1951 deaths
Italian stage actresses
Italian film actresses
Actresses from Milan
20th-century Italian actresses